Pierre Jarawan is a German-Lebanese writer. He was born in Amman, Jordan in 1985 and moved to Germany with his family at the age of three. He started writing as a teenager, inspired by the bedtime stories his father had told him as a child. He has since gained renown as a poetry slammer and a novelist. His books include The Storyteller and Song for the Missing. He won a literary scholarship from the City of Munich (the Bayerischer Kunstförderpreis) for The Storyteller. 

He lives in Munich.

References

German male writers
1985 births
Living people
Lebanese emigrants to Germany
People from Amman
Writers from Munich
Jordanian people of German descent